Cyril Zuma (14 February 1985 – 4 September 2015) was a South African football midfielder who played for seven clubs in a seven-year career and captained the under-23 national team, then led by Steve Komphela. Zuma died in September 2015, after a car accident the previous month had left him in a coma.

References

External links
 
 
 

People from eThekwini Metropolitan Municipality
2015 deaths
1985 births
Association football midfielders
Kaizer Chiefs F.C. players
Maritzburg United F.C. players
Moroka Swallows F.C. players
Mpumalanga Black Aces F.C. players
Road incident deaths in South Africa
Nathi Lions F.C. players
South African soccer players